Jesse Saarinen (born 29 July 1985) is a Finnish professional ice hockey forward who currently plays for HIFK in the Liiga. Saarinen has previously played in over 500 games in his native Finland's top league, Liiga.

Career statistics

Regular season and playoffs

International

References

External links
 

1985 births
Finnish ice hockey forwards
HPK players
HC Karlovy Vary players
Lahti Pelicans players
Living people
KHL Medveščak Zagreb players
SaiPa players
Oulun Kärpät players
Finnish expatriate sportspeople in Croatia
Sportspeople from Lahti
HIFK (ice hockey) players
Expatriate ice hockey players in Croatia
Dornbirn Bulldogs players
Finnish expatriate ice hockey players in the Czech Republic
Finnish expatriate ice hockey players in Austria